Neil Young Trunk Show is a 2009 documentary and concert film by Jonathan Demme, featuring Neil Young.
It is, along with Neil Young: Heart of Gold (2006) and Neil Young Journeys (2012), part of a Neil Young trilogy created by Demme.

Songs in the film
All songs are written by Young, except where otherwise noted.
 
 "Sad Movies" 
 "Harvest"
 "Cinnamon Girl"
 "Oh, Lonesome Me" - Written by Don Gibson
 "Kansas"
"Mexico"
 "Spirit Road"
 "No Hidden Path"
 "Ambulance Blues"
 "Mellow My Mind"
 "The Believer"
 "Like A Hurricane"
 "Cowgirl In The Sand"
 "The Sultan"

References

External links
 
 

Neil Young
Rockumentaries
Concert films
American documentary films
Documentary films about singers
2009 films
2009 documentary films
Films directed by Jonathan Demme
2000s English-language films
2000s American films